Hillel (Harry) Furstenberg (born September 29, 1935) is a German-born American-Israeli mathematician and professor emeritus at the Hebrew University of Jerusalem. He is a member of the Israel Academy of Sciences and Humanities and U.S. National Academy of Sciences and a laureate of the Abel Prize and the Wolf Prize in Mathematics. He is known for his application of probability theory and ergodic theory methods to other areas of mathematics, including number theory and Lie groups.

Biography
Furstenberg was born to German Jews in Nazi Germany, in 1935 (originally named "Fürstenberg"). In 1939, shortly after Kristallnacht, his family escaped to the United States and settled in the Washington Heights neighborhood of New York City, escaping the Holocaust. He attended Marsha Stern Talmudical Academy and then Yeshiva University, where he concluded his BA and MSc studies at the age of 20 in 1955. Furstenberg published several papers as an undergraduate, including  "Note on one type of indeterminate form" (1953) and "On the infinitude of primes" (1955).  Both appeared in the American Mathematical Monthly, the latter provided a topological proof of Euclid's famous theorem that there are infinitely many primes.

Academic career
Furstenberg pursued his doctorate at Princeton University under the supervision of Salomon Bochner.  In 1958 he received his PhD for his thesis, Prediction Theory.

From 1959–1960, Furstenberg served as the C. L. E. Moore instructor at the Massachusetts Institute of Technology.

Furstenberg got his first job as an assistant professor in 1961 at the University of Minnesota. Furstenberg was promoted to full professor at Minnesota but moved to Israel in 1965 to join at Hebrew University's Einstein Institute of Mathematics. He retired from Hebrew University in 2003. Furstenberg serves as an Advisory Committee member of The Center for Advanced Studies in Mathematics at Ben Gurion University of the Negev.

In 2003, Hebrew University and Ben-Gurion University held a joint conference to celebrate Furstenberg's retirement. The four-day Conference on Probability in Mathematics was subtitled Furstenfest 2003 and included four days of lectures.

In 1993, Furstenberg won the Israel Prize and in 2007, the Wolf Prize in mathematics. He is a member of the Israel Academy of Sciences and Humanities (elected 1974), the American Academy of Arts and Sciences (international honorary member since 1995), and the U.S. National Academy of Sciences (elected 1989).

Fustenberg has taught generations of students, including Alexander Lubotzky, Yuval Peres, Tamar Ziegler, Shahar Mozes, and Vitaly Bergelson.

Research accomplishments

Furstenberg gained attention at an early stage in his career for producing an innovative topological proof of the infinitude of prime numbers in 1955.

In a series of articles beginning in 1963 with A Poisson Formula for Semi-Simple Lie Groups, he continued to establish himself as a ground-breaking thinker.  His work showing that the behavior of random walks on a group is intricately related to the structure of the group  which led to what is now called the Furstenberg boundary  has been hugely influential in the study of lattices and Lie groups.

In his 1967 paper, Disjointness in ergodic theory, minimal sets, and a problem in Diophantine approximation, Furstenberg introduced the notion of 'disjointness,' a notion in ergodic systems that is analogous to coprimality for integers. The notion turned out to have applications in areas such as number theory, fractals, signal processing and electrical engineering.

In his 1977 paper, Ergodic behavior of diagonal measures and a theorem of Szemerédi on arithmetic progressions, Furstenberg used methods from ergodic theory to prove a celebrated result by Endre Szemerédi, which states that any subset of integers with positive upper density contains arbitrarily large arithmetic progressions. His insights led to important results, such as the proof by Ben Green and Terence Tao that the sequence of prime numbers includes arbitrary large arithmetic progressions.

He proved unique ergodicity of horocycle flows on compact hyperbolic Riemann surfaces in the early 1970s. In 1977, he gave an ergodic theory reformulation, and subsequently proof, of Szemerédi's theorem. The Furstenberg boundary and Furstenberg compactification of a locally symmetric space are named after him, as is the Furstenberg–Sárközy theorem in additive number theory.

Personal life
In 1958, Furstenberg married Rochelle (née) Cohen, a journalist and literary critic. Together they have five children and sixteen grandchildren.

Awards
 1977 – Rothschild Prize in Mathematics.
 1993 – Furstenberg received the Israel Prize, for exact sciences.
 1993 – Furstenberg received the Harvey Prize from Technion.
 2006/7 – He received the Wolf Prize in Mathematics.
 2006  He delivered the Paul Turán Memorial Lectures.
 2020 – He received the Abel Prize with Gregory Margulis "for pioneering the use of methods from probability and dynamics in group theory, number theory and combinatorics".

Selected publications
Furstenberg, Harry, Stationary processes and prediction theory, Princeton, N.J., Princeton University Press, 1960.
 
 
 
Furstenberg, Harry, Recurrence in ergodic theory and combinatorial number theory, Princeton, N.J., Princeton Univ. Press, 1981.

See also
List of Israel Prize recipients

References

External links

Mathematics Genealogy page
Press release
Israel Academy of Sciences and Humanities (Hebrew)

1935 births
20th-century American mathematicians
21st-century American mathematicians
Members of the United States National Academy of Sciences
People from Washington Heights, Manhattan
Living people
Abel Prize laureates
Israel Prize in exact science recipients
Israel Prize in exact science recipients who were mathematicians
Academic staff of the Hebrew University of Jerusalem
Members of the Israel Academy of Sciences and Humanities
Israeli mathematicians
Princeton University alumni
University of Minnesota faculty
Wolf Prize in Mathematics laureates
Yeshiva University alumni
Jewish emigrants from Nazi Germany to the United States
Massachusetts Institute of Technology School of Science faculty